So Natural is the fourth studio album released by the Christian rock band, Salvador.

The single "Heaven" off the release ranked number No. 2 on Billboards Hot Christian Songs.  The song "You Are There" also reached No. 27 on the same chart.

Track listing

"La Palabra" is sung completely in Spanish.

 Personnel Salvador Nic Gonzales – lead vocals, guitars, horn arrangements
 Chris Bevins – keyboards, horn arrangements, string arrangements
 Joel Cavazos – guitars, backing vocals 
 Josh Gonzales – bass
 Robert Acuña – drums 
 Esteban "Chamo" Lopez – percussion
 Jared Solis – alto saxophone, tenor saxophone, trombone, horn arrangements
 Pablo Gabaldon – trumpet, flugelhorn, horn arrangementsAdditional musicians Chris Rodriguez – guitars, backing vocals, horn arrangements
 Andrea Springall – strings

 Production 
 Nic Gonzales – producer 
 Chris Rodriguez – producer (1-4, 6-12), A&R direction
 Shane D. Wilson – engineer (1-4, 6-12), mixing (1-11)
 Chris Bevins – additional recording (1-4, 6-12), overdub recording (1-4, 6-12), producer (5), engineer (5), mixing (12)
 Boo MacLeod – engineer (5)
 Rob Clark – assistant engineer (1-4, 6-12)
 Jeff Hamilton – assistant engineer (5)
 Chris Henning – additional Pro Tools editing
 Tom Coyne – mastering (1-4, 6-12)
 Eric Conn – mastering (5)
 Donn Cobb – mastering (5)
 Shawn McSpadden – A&R direction
 Cheryl H. McTyre – A&R administration
 Mark Lusk – artist development
 Katherine Petillo – creative direction
 Louis LaPrad – art direction, design
 Blair Berle – senior creative administrator
 Thomas Petillo – photographer
 Lucy Santamassino – grooming, hair stylist 
 Karie Perkins – wardrobe stylist
 Michael Smith & Associates – management Studios'
Tracks 1-4 & 6-12
 Recorded at Masterlink Studio (Nashville, Tennessee).
 Additional recording at Warehouse Christian Ministries (Sacramento, California).
 Overdubs recorded at Working Man's Studio (Franklin, Tennessee).
 Mixed at Pentavarit (Nashville, Tennessee).
 Track 12 mixed at Working Man's Studio.
 Mastered at Sterling Sound (New York City, New York).

Track 5
 Recorded at Pedernales Recording Studios (Austin, Texas).
 Mixed at Pentavarit (Nashville, Tennessee).
 Mastered at Independent Mastering (Nashville, Tennessee).

Chart performance

References

2004 albums
Salvador (band) albums